Alsophila andersonii, synonym Cyathea andersonii, is a species of tree fern native to India, Bhutan and southern China, where it grows in moist valleys and montane forest at an altitude of 300–1200 m. The trunk is erect and 6–10 m tall. Fronds are bi- or tripinnate and 2–3 m long. The entire plant is relatively dark in appearance; the rachis is flushed with dark purple and the stipe is dark, almost to the point of being black.  Dark, lanceolate scales with pale fringes are sparsely scattered along the length of the stipe. Sori occur near the midvein of fertile pinnules and lack indusia.

The specific epithet andersonii is thought to commemorate Thomas Anderson (1832-1870), a botanist and director of the Calcutta botanical garden.

References

andersonii
Ferns of India
Flora of Bhutan
Flora of China
Flora of East Himalaya